Latourette is a surname. Notable people with the surname include:

Earl C. Latourette (1889–1956), American judge, Chief Justice of the Oregon Supreme Court
Kenneth Scott Latourette (1884–1968), American historian of East Asia and Christianity
Steve LaTourette (1954–2016), American politician
Sarah LaTourette (born 1984), American politician